Reliable Source Music (RSM) is a UK music production and publishing company that specializes in providing music to media professionals. RSM creates broadcast-quality music for use in advertising, TV, video, radio, film, multimedia, and corporate use, either off the shelf, or written to order. As of March 2019 the company had a library of over 100,000 tracks. This includes RSM's music along with sub-publishing deals with other music libraries around the world.

Key staff
The company was established in 1997 by Dr. Wayne Bickerton who was the Managing Director until November 2015. Following the passing of Dr. Wayne Bickerton in November 2015, the company was sold to Intervox Production Music in October 2017. In January 2019, Martin Weinert was installed as the Chairman of the board of Directors alongside Kenny Orr and Gilda Fulco as Directors.

Notable clients
Reliable Source Music has provided music to many TV programs, including Top Gear, The X-Files, A Question of Sport, EastEnders, and Doctor Who Confidential. RSM has supplied supply music for advertising campaigns such as; Easyjet, Johnnie Walker, Persil, and Vodafone.

Notable composers
Several notable composers work for the company. They include: Brian Bennett, John Cameron and Wayne Bickerton, founder of the company and composer of commercial hits throughout the 1970s.

References

External links
www.reliable-source.co.uk

Local mass media in London
Production music